Uzun is a district of Surxondaryo Region in Uzbekistan. The capital lies at the town Uzun. The district consists of 9 urban-type settlements (Uzun, Chinor, Ulanqul, Qarashiq, Yangi kuch, Jonchekka, Malandiyon, Mehnat, Yangi roʻzgʻor) and 7 rural communities.

References

Districts of Uzbekistan
Surxondaryo Region